Pristurus rupestris, also known as the rock semaphore gecko, Blanford's semaphore gecko, and Persia rock gecko, is a species of gecko in the genus Pristurus which inhabits parts of Arabia, Iran, Pakistan, Somalia, and Eritrea. This species lives in stony formations, mainly in flat, hard, sandy, barren regions and gravelly plains. It also lives  in open, dry forest and bushland. It can be found under stones, on the walls of buildings, and on beaches. It is an egg-laying species.

References

External links
 Pristurus rupestris. Arkive.org
 Pristurus rupestris. IUCN RedList.

Pristurus
Geckos of Iran
Reptiles described in 1874